Logan Furnace Mansion is a historic home located at Spring Township, Centre County, Pennsylvania. It is an "L"-shaped building, consisting of a -story, 5-bay stone main house, with a 2-story, stone kitchen ell.  The ell was the original home, built 1798 to 1800, and the main house was built in 1818.The house and iron furnace were built by John Dunlop (Bellefonte iron master). As of 1826 the furnace was capable of 1200 tons of pig iron per year. 
The stone house, a few large mill stones, and an iron workers house are still visible. Info from Linn's History of Centre County Pa.

It was added to the National Register of Historic Places in 1977.

References

Houses on the National Register of Historic Places in Pennsylvania
Houses completed in 1818
Houses in Centre County, Pennsylvania
National Register of Historic Places in Centre County, Pennsylvania